Kibutha is a settlement in Kenya's Central Province.

General information
Central Province is a key producer of coffee, one of Kenya's key exports. Much of Kenya's dairy industry is also based in this province.  The province's headquarters are in Nyeri. Central Province was divided into seven districts (wilaya'at) until 2007. The general dressing style is trousers and shirts for men and dresses or skirts for the women. The people usually have scraps of cloth tied to their foreheads during the hot days.

References 

Populated places in Central Province (Kenya)